Deborah G. Rosenblum is an American nuclear expert and former career civil servant. She currently serves as the Assistant Secretary of Defense for Nuclear, Chemical & Biological Defense Programs in the Biden administration.

Education and career 

Rosenblum holds a master’s degree from Columbia University’s School of International and Public Affairs and is a Phi Beta Kappa graduate with a bachelor’s degree from Middlebury College. Rosenblum was a vice president with The Cohen Group, an international consulting firm. She has also served as a career civil servant for 12 years in the Office of the Secretary of Defense, including as a member of the Senior Executive Service. She worked in the areas of nuclear forces, counter-proliferation policy, countering narcotics, homeland defense, and peacekeeping operations and support. She also represented the United States in multi-year bilateral negotiations with North Korea around its nuclear program. Rosenblum is the Executive Vice President of the Nuclear Threat Initiative; she is part of NTI’s executive leadership team and helps oversee the organization’s threat reduction programs, operations and development as well as co-chairs NTI’s task force on diversity, equity and inclusion.  She served as an advisor to President-elect Biden during his presidential transition.

Nomination as Assistant Secretary of Defense 

On April 23, 2021, President Joe Biden announced Rosenblum as his nominee to be the Assistant Secretary of Defense for Nuclear, Chemical & Biological Defense Programs. On April 27, 2021, her nomination was sent to the United States Senate. On May 27, 2021, a hearing was held on her nomination before the Senate Armed Services Committee. On July 29, she was confirmed by unanimous consent in the US Senate.

References

External links

Staff Bio at NTI

Living people
Year of birth missing (living people)
Place of birth missing (living people)
Middlebury College alumni
School of International and Public Affairs, Columbia University alumni
United States Assistant Secretaries of Defense
Biden administration personnel